The Alam's house is a historical house in Isfahan, Iran. The owner of the house was one of the Qajar aristocrats. The house has a yard, which is surrounded from every side by residential parts. The northern part is distinguished by a columned veranda and has a reception hall. There are two rooms on the two sides of the reception hall. In this hall, there are stucco and decorations with cut mirrors. The hall faces to veranda by seven sash windows and leads to the rooms by khatamkari doors. The southern part of the house is a narrow and long dining room, which has painted windows. Eastern and western parts have identical plans. Both of them have reception halls, which lead to the smaller rooms. All parts of the house have been decorated by brickwork, tiles, stucco and gilding. The limpid water in the stone howz in the middle of the yard reflects the beauty of the house.

See also
List of the historical structures in the Isfahan province

References 

Buildings and structures in Isfahan
Houses in Iran